Henry III (19 September 1551 – 2 August 1589) was King of France from 1574 until his assassination in 1589, as well as King of Poland and Grand Duke of Lithuania from 1573 to 1575. 

As the fourth son of King Henry II of France, he was not expected to inherit the French throne and thus was a good candidate for the vacant throne of the Polish–Lithuanian Commonwealth, where he was elected monarch in 1573. During his brief rule, he signed the Henrician Articles into law, recognizing the szlachta's right to freely elect their monarch. Aged 22, Henry abandoned Poland–Lithuania upon inheriting the French throne when his brother, Charles IX, died without issue.

France was at the time plagued by the Wars of Religion, and Henry's authority was undermined by violent political factions funded by foreign powers: the Catholic League (supported by Spain and the Pope), the Protestant Huguenots (supported by England and the Dutch) and the Malcontents (led by Henry's own brother the Duke of Anjou and Alençon, a party of Catholic and Protestant aristocrats who jointly opposed the absolutist ambitions of the king).

After the death of Henry's younger brother Francis, Duke of Anjou, and when it became apparent that Henry would not produce an heir, the Wars of Religion developed into a succession crisis, the War of the Three Henrys. Henry III's legitimate heir was his distant cousin, King Henry III of Navarre, a Protestant. The Catholic League, led by Henry I, Duke of Guise, sought to exclude Protestants from the succession and championed the Catholic Charles, Cardinal of Bourbon, as Henry III's heir.

In 1589, Jacques Clément, a Catholic fanatic, murdered Henry III. He was succeeded by the King of Navarre who, as Henry IV, assumed the throne of France after converting to Catholicism, as the first French king of the House of Bourbon.

Early life

Childhood
Henry was born at the royal Château de Fontainebleau, the fourth son of King Henry II and Catherine de' Medici. He was a grandson of Francis I of France and Claude of France. His older brothers were Francis II of France, Charles IX of France, and Louis of Valois. He was made Duke of Angoulême and Duke of Orléans in 1560, then Duke of Anjou in 1566.

He was his mother's favourite; she called him chers yeux ("precious eyes") and lavished fondness and affection upon him for most of his life. His elder brother, Charles, grew to detest him, partially because he resented his better health.

The royal children were raised under the supervision of Diane de Poitiers, his father's mistress.

Youth

Although he was skilled and fond of fencing, he preferred to indulge his tastes for the arts and reading. These predilections were attributed to his Italian mother. Henry's favourite interests were hunting and riding.

At one point in his youth Henry showed a tendency towards Protestantism as a means of rebelling. At the age of nine, he called himself "a little Huguenot", attended Mass only to please his mother, sang Protestant psalms to his sister Margaret (exhorting her all the while to change her religion and cast her Book of Hours into the fire), and even bit the nose off a statue of Saint Paul. His mother firmly cautioned him against such behaviour, and he would never again show any Protestant tendencies. Instead, he became staunchly Roman Catholic.

In the factional dispute that engulfed France in the wake of Henry II's death in 1559, Henry was solicited by Henry, son of Francis Duke of Guise, at the behest of Jacques, Duke of Nemours, to run away from court to be a figurehead for the ultra-Catholics. However, the plot was uncovered before any action could be taken.

Henry was known as a flaneur, who relished leisurely strolls through Paris and partook in the sociability in the busiest of neighbourhoods. He revelled in fairs, music, bilboquet and court masques. His extravagance in court entertainments cut him off from the common people. He was also a devout Catholic who introduced pious reforms into the city and he encouraged the French church to follow the edicts of the Council of Trent.

Sexuality

Reports that Henry engaged in same-sex relations with his court favourites, known as the mignons, date back to his own time. He was known to have enjoyed intense relationships with them. The scholar Louis Crompton maintains that all of the contemporary rumours were true. Some modern historians dispute this. Jean-Francois Solnon, Nicolas Le Roux and Jacqueline Boucher have noted that Henry had many famous mistresses, that he was well known for his taste in beautiful women, and that no male sex partners have been identified. They have concluded that the idea he was homosexual was promoted by his political opponents (both Protestant and Catholic) who used his dislike of war and hunting to depict him as effeminate and undermine his reputation with the French people. The portrait of a self-indulgent sodomite, incapable of fathering an heir to the throne, proved useful in efforts by the Catholic League to secure the succession for Cardinal Charles de Bourbon after 1585.

Gary Ferguson found their interpretations unconvincing: "It is difficult to reconcile the king whose use of favourites is so logically strategic with the man who goes to pieces when one of them dies." Katherine Crawford, by contrast, emphasizes the problems Henry's reputation encountered because of his failure to produce an heir and the presence of his powerful mother at court, combined with his enemies' insistence on conflating patronage with favouritism and luxury with decadence.

Elizabeth
In 1570, discussions commenced arranging for Henry to court Queen Elizabeth I of England. Elizabeth, almost 37, was expected by many parties in her country to marry and produce an heir. However, nothing came of these discussions. In initiating them, Elizabeth is viewed by historians as having intended only to arouse the concern of Spain, rather than contemplate marriage seriously. Henry's mother felt the chance of marriage despite differing religious views (Henry was Catholic, Elizabeth Protestant) simply required personal sacrifice.

Wars of Religion

In November 1567, upon the death of Anne de Montmorency, Henry assumed the role of Lieutenant-General of France, placing him in nominal control of France's military. Henry served as a leader of the royal army, taking part in the victories over the Huguenots at the Battle of Jarnac (March 1569) and at the Battle of Moncontour (October 1569). At this time he was a rallying point for the ultra-Catholics at court, who saw him as an opposition figure to the tolerant line being taken by the King, with Charles, Cardinal of Lorraine guiding his council. Lorraine offered him 200,000 Francs of Church revenue to become a protector of Catholicism, and tried to arrange his marriage to Mary, Queen of Scots; however neither project took off.

While still Duke of Anjou, he helped plot the St. Bartholomew's Day Massacre of 1572. Though Henry did not participate directly, historian Thierry Wanegffelen sees him as the royal most responsible for the massacre, which involved the targeted killing of many Huguenot leaders. Henry III's reign as King of France, like those of his elder brothers Francis and Charles, would see France in constant turmoil over religion.

Henry continued to take an active role in the Wars of Religion, and in 1572/1573 led the siege of La Rochelle, a massive military assault on the Huguenot-held city. At the end of May 1573, Henry learned that the Polish szlachta had elected him King of Poland (a country with a large Protestant minority at the time) and political considerations forced him to negotiate an end to the siege. Negotiators reached an agreement on 24 June 1573, and Catholic troops ended the siege on 6 July 1573.

King of Poland and Grand Duke of Lithuania (1573–1575)
Following the death of the Polish ruler Sigismund II Augustus on 7 July 1572, Jean de Monluc was sent as the French envoy to Poland to negotiate the election of Henry to the Polish throne in exchange for military support against Russia, diplomatic assistance in dealing with the Ottoman Empire, and financial subsidies.

On 16 May 1573, Polish nobles chose Henry as the first elected monarch of the Polish–Lithuanian Commonwealth. The Lithuanian nobles boycotted this election, however, and it was left to the Lithuanian ducal council to confirm his election. The commonwealth elected Henry, rather than Habsburg candidates, partly in order to be more agreeable to the Ottoman Empire (a traditional ally of France through the Franco-Ottoman alliance) and strengthen a Polish-Ottoman alliance that was in effect.

A Polish delegation went to La Rochelle to meet with Henry, who was leading the Siege of La Rochelle. Henry left the siege following their visit. In Paris, on 10 September, the Polish delegation asked Henry to take an oath, at Notre Dame Cathedral, to "respect traditional Polish liberties and the law on religious freedom that had been passed during the interregnum". As a condition of his election, he was compelled to sign the pacta conventa and the Henrician Articles, pledging religious tolerance in the Polish–Lithuanian Commonwealth. Henry chafed at the restrictions on monarchic power under the Polish-Lithuanian political system of "Golden Liberty". The Polish-Lithuanian parliament had been urged by Anna Jagiellon, the sister of the recently deceased king Sigismund II Augustus, to elect him based on the understanding that Henry would wed Anna afterward.

At a ceremony before the Parlement of Paris on 13 September, the Polish delegation handed over the "certificate of election to the throne of Poland-Lithuania". Henry also gave up any claims to succession and he "recognized the principle of free election" under the Henrician Articles and the pacta conventa.

It was not until January 1574 that Henry was to reach the borders of Poland. On 21 February, Henry's coronation was held in Kraków. In mid-June 1574, upon learning of the death of his brother Charles IX, Henry left Poland and headed back to France. Henry's absence provoked a constitutional crisis that the Parliament attempted to resolve by notifying Henry that his throne would be lost if he did not return from France by 12 May 1575. His failure to return caused Parliament to declare his throne vacant.

The short reign of Henry at Wawel Castle in Poland was marked by a clash of cultures between the Polish and the French. The young king and his followers were astonished by several Polish practices and disappointed by the rural poverty and harsh climate of the country. The Poles, on the other hand, wondered if all Frenchmen were as concerned with their appearance as their new king appeared to be.

In many aspects, Polish culture had a positive influence on France. At Wawel, the French were introduced to new technologies of septic facilities, in which litter (excrement) was taken outside the castle walls. On returning to France, Henry wanted to order the construction of such facilities at the Louvre and other palaces. Other inventions introduced to the French by the Polish included a bath with regulated hot and cold water, as well as dining forks.

In 1578, Henry created the Order of the Holy Spirit to commemorate his becoming first King of Poland and later King of France on the Feast of Pentecost and gave it precedence over the earlier Order of St. Michael, which had lost much of its original prestige by being awarded too frequently and too readily. The Order would retain its prestige as the premier chivalric order of France until the end of the French monarchy.

French reign (1574–1589)
Henry was crowned king of France on 13 February 1575 at Reims Cathedral. Although he was expected to produce an heir after he married the 21-year-old Louise of Lorraine on 14 February 1575, no issue resulted from their union.

In 1576, Henry signed the Edict of Beaulieu, which granted many concessions to the Huguenots. His action resulted in the Henry I, Duke of Guise, forming the Catholic League. After much posturing and negotiations, Henry was forced to rescind most of the concessions that had been made to the Protestants in the edict.

In 1584, the king's youngest brother and heir presumptive, Francis, Duke of Anjou, died. Under Salic Law, the next heir to the throne was Protestant Henry of Navarre, a descendant of Louis IX (Saint Louis). The possibility of a Protestant on the throne led to the War of the Three Henrys. Under pressure from the duke of Guise, Henry III issued an edict suppressing Protestantism and annulling Henry of Navarre's right to the throne.

Henry III, stung by the open disobedience of Guise, attempted a coup in May 1588 and sent royal Swiss troops into several neighbourhoods. This had the unintended effect of rallying the people against him and in favor of the more popular Guise during the Day of the Barricades. Henry III fled the city; he later sought support from the Parlement of Paris and propped up an anti-League establishment throughout France.

Following the defeat of the Spanish Armada that summer, the king's fear of Spanish support for the Catholic League apparently waned. Accordingly, on 23 December 1588, at the Château of Blois, he invited Guise to the council chamber where the duke's brother Louis II, Cardinal of Guise, already waited. The duke was told that the king wished to see him in the private room adjoining the royal bedroom. There, royal guardsmen murdered the duke, then the cardinal. To make certain that no contender for the French throne was free to act against him, the king had the duke's son imprisoned. The duke of Guise had been very popular in France, and the citizenry turned against Henry for the murders. The Parlement instituted criminal charges against the king, and he was compelled to join forces with his heir, the Protestant Henry of Navarre, by setting up the Parliament of Tours.

By 1589 Henry's popularity hit a new low. Preachers were calling for his assassination and labelling him a tyrant. The people of Paris disdained him for his court extravagances, allowing corruption to grow rife, high taxes and having relied extensively on Italian financiers. But what most Parisians hated most about him was his alleged sexuality, as sodomy was seen as heresy and a social deviance at the time.

Overseas relations
Under Henry, France named the first Consul of France in Morocco in the person of Guillaume Bérard. The request came from the Moroccan prince Abd al-Malik, who had been saved by Bérard, a doctor by profession, during an epidemic in Constantinople and wished to retain Bérard in his service.<ref>{{cite book|url=https://books.google.com/books?id=h97ivaPeOx8C&pg=PA277|title=Cervantes in Algiers: a captive's tale'&#39|author=Garcés, María Antonia|year=2005|page=277 note 39|isbn=9780826514707}}</ref>

Henry III encouraged the exploration and development of New World territories. In 1588, he granted Jacques Noël, the nephew of Jacques Cartier, privileges over fishing, fur trading, and mining in New France.

Assassination and burial

On 1 August 1589, Henry III lodged with his army at Saint-Cloud, and was preparing to attack Paris, when a young fanatical Dominican friar, Jacques Clément, carrying false papers, was granted access to deliver important documents to the king. The friar gave the king a bundle of papers and stated that he had a secret message to deliver. The king signaled for his attendants to step back for privacy, and Clément whispered in his ear while plunging a knife into his abdomen. Clément was then killed on the spot by the guards.

At first, the king's wound did not appear fatal, but he enjoined all the officers around him, in case he did not survive, to be loyal to Henry of Navarre as their new king. The following morning, on the day that he was to have launched his assault to retake Paris, Henry III died.

Chaos swept the attacking army, most of it quickly melting away; the proposed attack on Paris was postponed. Inside the city, joy at the news of Henry III's death was near delirium; some hailed the assassination as an act of God.

Henry III was interred at the Saint Denis Basilica. Childless, he was the longest-living of Henry II's sons to have become king and also the last of the Valois kings. Henry III of Navarre succeeded him as Henry IV, the first of the kings of the House of Bourbon.

 Arms 

 Ancestors 

In popular culture

Poetry
Jan Kochanowski, Gallo crocitanti (1576)
Pierre Matthieu, La Guisiade (1589)

Theatre
George Chapman, The Tragedy of Bussy D'Ambois (1607) and The Revenge of Bussy D'Ambois (1613)
John Dryden and Nathaniel Lee, The Duke of Guise (1683)
 Alexandre Dumas, père's Henry III and His Court (1829)
Christopher Marlowe, The Massacre at Paris (1593)

Novel
 Alexandre Dumas's novels: La Reine Margot (1845), La Dame de Monsoreau (1846) and Les quarante-cinq (1847) as well as  Les deux Diane (1846) 
 Stanley Weyman, A Gentleman of France (1893), involves the events of Henry's reconciliation with the Huguenots and struggle against the Catholic League, leading to his assassination.

Robert Merle Paris ma bonne ville (1980)
Robert Merle Le prince que voilà (1982)
Robert Merle La violente amour (1983)
Jean Plaidy Queen Jezebel (1953)
Michel Zevaco Les Pardaillan (1900)
S.J. Parris Conspiracy (2015)

Film
 The French short film The Assassination of the Duke de Guise (1908) shows the Duke's assassination but not the Cardinal's. The co-director, Charles Le Bargy, plays the Duke.
 The American silent film Intolerance (1916) depicts Henry as effeminate but not explicitly homosexual. He is portrayed by the British-born American actor Maxfield Stanley.
 The French movies La Reine Margot (1954) and La Reine Margot (1994), both based on Alexandre Dumas, père's novel of the same title, are fictional depictions of the lives of Henry III's family, his sister Margot, and her Protestant husband Henry around the time of the St. Bartholomew's Day Massacre. In the 1994 film, Henry is played by the actor Pascal Greggory. In Dumas' novel, Henri was not portrayed as homosexual, whereas, in the 1954 film, he was shown as an effeminate, comical queen. In the 1994 film, he was portrayed as a more sinister character, bisexual and showing sexual interest in his sister. His brother dies by being accidentally poisoned by his mother, who had intended to kill Henry of Navarre instead.
 As the Duke of Anjou, the future Henry III plays a significant role in the French film The Princess of Montpensier, based on the novel of the same title by Madame de La Fayette.
 The film Elizabeth, released in 1998, depicts a fictional courtship between Elizabeth I of England and Henry III while he was still Duke of Anjou. In reality, the two never met and the Queen of England was actually courted nearly ten years later by his younger brother François, Duke of Anjou, when Elizabeth was 46. The film borrows some of the aspects of Henry III's life and features Anjou as a comical foolish transvestite. The role is portrayed by the French actor Vincent Cassel.
 In the film Dangerous Beauty, he has an assignation with the main character, the Venetian courtesan Veronica Franco. Visiting a Venice eager for military aid, the "French king" chooses her from among the famous courtesans of that city because he notices her reluctance; placing a blade at her neck, he tells Veronica that the "rumours" about him are true (that "the king is a pervert"), and the implication is made that Veronica pleases him enormously by first correctly guessing at and then indulging his fetish for BDSM domination.  (When the king emerges from Franco's house in the morning, the assembled Venetian nobility awaiting, he smiles broadly while carefully settling his presumably sore posterior on a pillow, and then declares that the French navy shall assist the Venetians against the Ottoman Empire in defense of their rule of Cyprus.) He is played by the British actor Jake Weber.

Television
 In an episode of Animaniacs entitled "The Three Muska-Warners", an Elmer Fudd–like Henri III is protected by Yakko, Wakko and Dot. In this version, Henri is portrayed by Jeff Bennett as a very old man who acts nervous and jumpy, and for no apparent reason speaks with an English accent.
 He is also featured in a few episodes in the first and fourth seasons of the CW show Reign. In the show's fourth season, Henry is played by Nick Slater. With his brother showing little interest in the job, Spain wants Henry to become France's king.

Opera
 Chabrier's opéra-comique Le roi malgré lui (1887) deals with the unhappy Polish episode, with Henri as the reluctant King of Poland. In Kraków, he conspires with Polish nobles to depose himself. His friend Nangis changes places with him, but in the end, the plot fails and the curtain falls on Henri being crowned.

See also

 Chicot
 History of Poland (1569–1795)
 Les Mignons
 Louis Duret

Notes

References

 Crawford, Katherine B., "Love, Sodomy, and Scandal: Controlling the Sexual Reputation of Henry III", Journal of the History of Sexuality'', vol. 12 (2003), 513–42

External links

 Portraits of Henri III 
 
 historytoday 

|-

|-

|-

|-

|-

|-

|-

 
1550s in France
1551 births
1589 deaths
16th-century kings of France
16th-century Polish monarchs
16th-century LGBT people
16th-century murdered monarchs
16th-century peers of France
Ancien Régime
Assassinated French people
Burials at the Basilica of Saint-Denis
Deaths by stabbing in France
Dukes of Angoulême
Dukes of Anjou
Dukes of Orléans
French people of the French Wars of Religion
Grand Dukes of Lithuania
Heirs presumptive to the French throne
House of Valois-Angoulême
Knights of the Garter
LGBT Roman Catholics
LGBT royalty
Nostradamus
People from Fontainebleau
People murdered in France
Murder in 1589